Marshall Field and Company Clubhouse, also known as Fieldcrest Lodge, is a historic clubhouse located at Fieldale, Henry County, Virginia. It was built in 1917, and is a two-story, Tudor Revival style building.   It is constructed of native Henry County fieldstone, box beams, pebble dash stucco, and red terra cotta roof tile.  Also on the property are a contributing carriage house, manager's house with a matching shed structure and a three-stall barn, and a regulation size tennis court.  The clubhouse was built by Marshall Field and Company to house important figures visiting the Fieldcrest Mills.

It was listed on the National Register of Historic Places in 2005.  It is located in the Fieldale Historic District.

References

Clubhouses on the National Register of Historic Places in Virginia
Buildings and structures completed in 1917
Buildings and structures in Henry County, Virginia
National Register of Historic Places in Henry County, Virginia
Individually listed contributing properties to historic districts on the National Register in Virginia